Nazli Tabatabai-Khatambakhsh is an Opera Doctoral Researcher Practice Based at the Guildhall School of Music and Drama, 2021-2025. She was the founder and artistic director (CEO) of ZENDEH, a former Arts Council England National Portfolio Organisation.

Early life
Nazli Tabatabai-Khatambakhsh was born in the northern Iranian city of Tabriz in February 1977.  She came to the UK with her parents when she was very young. Her father was an academic, and they settled in Edinburgh, where he was working. Nazli went to James Gillespie's High School.

She began work in 2001 as a trainee director at Leicester Haymarket Theatre and then at the Theatre Workshop Edinburgh. In 2004, she founded the Zendeh Theatre Company – the name means "alive" in Persian.

She quotes her influences on her creative practise to include international theatre, politics of the Middle East, sciences, and stories from the silk routes. These can be seen as a direct influence on her creative directing and productions developed with the Zendeh theatre company.

Career
Nazli Tabatabai-Khatambakhsh was the artistic director of ZENDEH, a theatre company based in the northeast of England that was part of Arts Council England's National Portfolio of Organisations. The company created enchanting theatre that combines poetic elements, mythology and explored global political and social perspectives in a most approachable way. Iranian myths and contemporary reference points appeared in many of ZENDEH's shows reflecting the cultural heritage of Artistic director Nazli Tabatabai-Khatambakhsh. Although the work itself often rejects cultural representation instead creating a more impressionistic, magical realism, visual and physical style of theatre. ZENDEH often explore hidden histories and modern identities; finding the compelling and epic in ordinary stories and crafting culturally eclectic productions. ZENDEH's and Nazli's direction and artistic practice is collaborative; working with artists and the wider public, combining art forms and using digital technologies to continually find imaginative ways to share stories and find human connections.

Over Nazli's career she has developed a strong leadership role in producing diverse theatre in the UK in particular looking at themes of the Middle East and the lives of women.

Nazli Tabatabai-Khatambakhsh serves as a member of the Royal Central School of Speech and Drama's Independent Equity Committee as well as the International Society of Performing Arts' (ISPA) governing committee in New York.

Achievements
Nazli Tabatabai-Khatambakhsh through the over ten years as artistic director with ZENDEH has developed a unique multi-staged method of creating theatrical productions that is relevant to 21st Century Britain. The ZENDEH method encompasses seven stages that includes, but is not restricted to, blue sky thinking; collaboration in multidisciplinary art forms and working with a wide range of associate artists; emphasis on dramaturgy; and re-approaching joint authorship with participation, engagement and research.

Nazli Tabatabai-Khatambakhsh also leads on the Creative Case North, which is a re-imagining of Arts Council England’s approach to diversity and equality, setting out how these areas can and should enrich the arts for artists, audiences and wider society.

Selected Works
 68 Months In Waiting
 Khaki
 Paper Dolls

Personal life
Nazli is a dual citizen of Iran and of the United Kingdom, daughter of Dr. M. T. Tabatabai-Khatambaksh and Mrs M. Tabatabai-Khatambakhsh. She is based in London.

References

External links
 Creative Case NORTH with Arts Council England
 Nazli Tabatabai-Khatambakhsh's Biography, International Society for the Performing Arts
 List of Plays by Nazli Tabatabai-Khatambakhsh
 Nazli Tabatabai-Khatambakhsh, The Royal Central School of Speech and Drama

1977 births
Living people
Iranian actresses
Iranian emigrants to the United Kingdom
Iranian theatre directors
Iranian writers